Yugar is a surmane. Notable people with the surname include:
Theresa A. Yugar, Latina theologian
Zulma Yugar (born 1952), Bolivian politician and singer

See also
Yugar, Queensland